Kumbira is a professional and student culinary show and live competition held in Cagayan de Oro, Mindanao, Philippines. It is the largest culinary event in Mindanao, lasting for three days.

References

Cooking competitions
Philippine cuisine